Thom "Tex" Edwards (born in Dallas, Texas, United States), is an American country and punk rock vocalist and songwriter. Allmusic Guide calls him "a pioneering, under-appreciated, and often neglected chronicler of the offbeat and eccentric traditions of country rock & roll."

Punk years 
T. Tex Edwards came to prominence as the lead vocalist of Dallas area punk band The Nervebreakers. They had a minor hit with the single "My Girlfriend is a Rock," and opened for bands like The Ramones in 1977, Sex Pistols on their 1978 US Tour and The Clash in 1980.

Country rock 
After The Nerverbreakers, influenced by The Cramps and Gun Club T. Tex turned to rockabilly with Tex & The Saddletramps. Their song "Move It!" was later covered by LeRoi Brothers, but the band soon disbanded. Other acts followed, like Out on Parole in 1984, Loafin' Hyenas in 1987, followed by a succession of other bands named tongue firmly in cheek: The Swingin' Cornflake Killers (1991–1996), Tex & The Toetags (1998–2000), The Affordable Caskets (2000–2003) and Purple Stickpin (2010–current).

Both Out on Parole and Loafin' Hyenas released LPs in the late 1980s and early 1990s followed by a succession of 7" singles on various independent labels and under numerous names. "Up Against the Floor," backed by The Swingin' Cornflake Killers, came out in 1996 and a retrospective compilation of odds and ends "Intexicated!" came out in 2012.

Partial discography

References

 AllMusic Biography
 Saustex Records Interview
 PunkGlobe article on Nervebreakers
 Official Nervebreakers Website

External links 
T. Tex Edwards Official Facebook
T. Tex Edwards Official Twitter
T. Tex's Hexes Blog
T. Tex Edwards on Tumblr
Official Nervebreakers Website

Living people
Musicians from Dallas
American country singer-songwriters
American punk rock singers
Singer-songwriters from Texas
Country musicians from Texas
Year of birth missing (living people)